The 2007 J. League Division 2 season is the 36th season of the second-tier club football in Japan and the 9th season since the establishment of J2 League.  The season began on March 3 and ended on December 1.

In this season, thirteen clubs competed in the quadruple round-robin format for the top two promotion slots. Farther, the third placed-finisher participated in the Pro/Rele Series for the promotion.  There were no relegation to the third-tier Japan Football League.

General

Promotion and relegation
 At the end of the 2006 season, Yokohama FC, Kashiwa Reysol, and Vissel Kobe were promoted to J1
 At the end of the 2006 season,  Avispa Fukuoka, Cerezo Osaka, and Kyoto Purple Sanga were relegated to J2.

Changes in competition format 
none

Changes in clubs
Kyoto Purple Sanga was renamed to Kyoto Sanga F.C.

Clubs

Following thirteen clubs played in J. League Division 2 during 2007 season. Of these clubs, Avispa Fukuoka, Cerezo Osaka, and Kyoto Sanga F.C. relegated from J1 last year.

 Consadole Sapporo
 Vegalta Sendai
 Montedio Yamagata
 Mito HollyHock
 Thespa Kusatsu
 Tokyo Verdy 1969
 Shonan Bellmare
 Kyoto Sanga F.C. 
 Cerezo Osaka 
 Tokushima Vortis
 Ehime F.C.
 Avispa Fukuoka 
 Sagan Tosu

League format
Thirteen clubs will play in quadruple round-robin format, a total of 48 games each. A club receives 3 points for a win, 1 point for a tie, and 0 points for a loss. The clubs are ranked by points, and tie breakers are, in the following order:
 Goal differential
 Goals scored
 Head-to-head results
A draw would be conducted, if necessary.  However, if two clubs are tied at the first place, both clubs will be declared as the champions. The top two clubs will be promoted to J1, while the 3rd placed club plays a two-legged promotion/relegation series.
Changes from previous year
none

Final league table

Final results

Top scorers

Attendance

References

J2 League seasons
2
Japan
Japan